Jacobo Garcia (born October 20, 1972) is a boxer who represents the United States Virgin Islands. He competed at the 1992 Summer Olympics and the 1996 Summer Olympics.

References

External links
 

1972 births
Living people
United States Virgin Islands male boxers
Olympic boxers of the United States Virgin Islands
Boxers at the 1992 Summer Olympics
Boxers at the 1996 Summer Olympics
Place of birth missing (living people)
Light-welterweight boxers